Barton upon Irwell (also known as Barton-on-Irwell or Barton) is a suburb of the City of Salford, Greater Manchester, England, with a population of 12,462 in 2014.

History
Barton Old Hall, a brick-built house degraded to a farmhouse, was the seat of the Barton, Booth and Leigh families. The church was demolished in the 1970s due to dry rot and the parish was merged with the neighbouring church of St Michael & All Angels, Peel Green.

Governance

Within the boundaries of the historic county of Lancashire, Barton-upon-Irwell was a township in the ecclesiastical parish of Eccles in the hundred of Salford. Barton was joined with the municipal borough of Eccles in 1933 which was at the time part of the Lancashire administrative county. Eccles joined the City of Salford, Greater Manchester in 1974. Barton upon Irwell is currently represented in Westminster by Barbara Keeley MP for Worsley and Eccles South.

Councillors

From 2004 to 2021 the area was represented on Salford City Council by three councillors serving the ward of Barton.

 indicates seat up for re-election.

Boundary changes coming in to effect at the 2021 Salford City Council election abolished the Barton ward and the Barton and Winton ward was created in its place.

Geography
The Irwell was the boundary as far as the River Mersey, which with the Glazebrook were also boundaries.

Religion
The Lords of the Manor; the de Traffords were Roman Catholics and the Grade I listed All Saints' Church was built at their expense between 1865 and 1868 by Edward Welby Pugin. It ceased to be a parish church in 1961 and was taken over by the Friars Minor Conventual. Land for its graveyard given by the de Traffords is on the far side of the ship canal.

The de Traffords believed in religious freedom and paid for churches and chapels of other denominations. Between 1865 and 1868, the Church of England St Catherine's Church was built at their expense to the rear of All Saints' Church. It was demolished in the late 1970s. The graveyard remains and is the last resting place of Marshall Stevens.
 
Barton upon Irwell Methodist Chapel, built in 1796, was a short distance from the bridge. The buildings were taken over in 1973 by the Church of the Nazarene, but were later abandoned and demolished in 2001 for housing, causing controversy over the treatment of the graveyard by the developers.

Transport
Barton is on the north bank of the Manchester Ship Canal and the River Irwell. A pair of ship locks is on the western edge of the district. It is also home to Barton Swing Aqueduct, which carries the Bridgewater Canal over the Manchester Ship Canal. From the late 19th century, the road from Barton to Stretford was carried over the canal by a low-level swing bridge, the opening of which for shipping to pass caused lengthy traffic delays to vehicles.

Before the Manchester Ship Canal was built, the Bridgewater Canal crossed the Irwell by a stone aqueduct of three arches, which was the first constructed in England over a navigable river.

The Liverpool and Manchester Railway, opened in 1830, passes through the township.
Barton Aerodrome was opened on 1 January 1930 and was the first permanent municipal airfield in the United Kingdom. Scheduled internal passenger flights operated in 1930 and again from 1934 to 1938, when the services were transferred to the new larger Ringway Airport (now Manchester Airport). Several charter airlines and flying clubs were based at the airport prewar.

During the Second World War over 700 aircraft were built here by F. Hills & Son and over 1,000 military aircraft were repaired by several firms. In 1946, the Lancashire Aero Club, founded in 1924 and the oldest flying club in the UK, moved here from Woodford Aerodrome, Cheshire. Barton is now a thriving general aviation airfield owned by Peel Holdings and is the base for over 150 private and club aircraft.

Culture and cultural references

Featured in the last scene of the 1961 film A Taste of Honey, the Barton Aqueduct and Swing Bridge are seen as the character of Tom sails away. In the film's opening scenes of street life in Salford, two young children are seen playing. One of them, the 5-year-old Hazel Blears, grew up to become the Member of Parliament for Salford and a Cabinet Minister.
Whilst the Barton Swing Bridge does feature in the 1961 film A Taste of Honey, the scene featuring Tom the sailor on the rotating bridge is in fact the Trafford Road Swing Bridge – in the background of the shot the now demolished Henshaw's Blind Asylum can be seen as the bridge turntable shifts.

Sport
The 12,000-capacity AJ Bell Stadium, home ground of Salford Red Devils Rugby League and Sale Sharks Rugby Union, opened in 2012.

References
Notes

External links
History on Barton Aerodrome

Areas of Salford
Eccles, Greater Manchester
Salford City Council Wards